The Tiger Scout (Korean: 범스카우트) is the highest rank and award a Scout or Venture Scout can achieve in the Korea Scout Association.

The Tiger Scout Association of Korea is the organization of the members who have achieved the Tiger Scout award.

See also
 List of highest awards in Scouting

Scout and Guide awards
Scouting in South Korea